Liberty Township is one of thirteen townships in Henry County, Indiana, United States. As of the 2010 census, its population was 1,455 and it contained 602 housing units.

Liberty Township was organized in 1822.

Geography
The streams of Bat Run, Batson Drain, Bell Run, Coo Run, Gravel Run, Millville Drain, Mud Run, Number One Arm, Number Two Arm, Pebble Run, Stone Branch, Tail Run and Wind Run run through this township.

Unincorporated towns
 Ashland
 Corwin
 Millville
 Pierson Station
(This list is based on USGS data and may include former settlements.)

Adjacent townships
 Blue River Township (north)
 Dalton Township, Wayne County (northeast)
 Jefferson Township, Wayne County (east)
 Jackson Township, Wayne County (southeast)
 Dudley Township (south)
 Franklin Township (southwest)
 Henry Township (west)
 Prairie Township (northwest)

Cemeteries
The township contains two cemeteries: Bell and White Heart.

Major highways
  Indiana State Road 38

Airports and landing strips
 New Castle-Henry County Municipal Airport

References
 
 United States Census Bureau cartographic boundary files

External links
 Indiana Township Association
 United Township Association of Indiana

Townships in Henry County, Indiana
Townships in Indiana